Lesvin Aníbal Marroquín Córdova (born 7 December 1992) is a Guatemalan badminton player.

Achievements

Pan Am Championships 
Men's doubles

Central American and Caribbean Games 
Men's doubles

Mixed doubles

BWF International Challenge/Series (14 titles, 9 runner-up) 
Men's singles

Men's doubles

Mixed doubles

  BWF International Challenge tournament
  BWF International Series tournament
  BWF Future Series tournament

References

External links 
 

1992 births
Living people
People from Baja Verapaz Department
Guatemalan male badminton players
Central American and Caribbean Games gold medalists for Guatemala
Central American and Caribbean Games bronze medalists for Guatemala
Competitors at the 2014 Central American and Caribbean Games
Competitors at the 2018 Central American and Caribbean Games
Central American and Caribbean Games medalists in badminton